Queally is a surname. Notable people with the surname include:

 Hylda Queally (born 1961), Irish-American talent agent 
 Jason Queally (born 1970), English track cyclist
 Peter Queally (born 1970), Irish retired hurler and Gaelic footballer
 Tom Queally (born 1984), Irish thoroughbred horse racing jockey

See also
 Quealy